Rikhan-e Yek (also Romanized as Rīkhān-e Yek, meaning "Rikhan 1") is a village in Miyankuh-e Sharqi Rural District, Mamulan District, Pol-e Dokhtar County, Lorestan Province, Iran. At the 2006 census, its population was 152, in 43 families.

References 

Towns and villages in Pol-e Dokhtar County